A communist state, also known as a Marxist–Leninist state, is a one-party state that is administered and governed by a communist party guided by Marxism–Leninism. Marxism–Leninism was the state ideology of the Soviet Union, the Comintern after Bolshevisation and the communist states within the Comecon, the Eastern Bloc, and the Warsaw Pact. Marxism–Leninism currently still remains the ideology of a few parties around the world. After its peak when many communist states were established, the Revolutions of 1989 brought down most of the communist states, however, it is still the official ideology of the ruling parties of China, Cuba, Laos, and Vietnam. During most of the 20th century, before the Revolutions of 1989, around one-third of the world's population lived under communist states.

Communist states are typically authoritarian and are typically administered through democratic centralism by a single centralised communist party apparatus. These parties are usually Marxist–Leninist or some national variation thereof such as Maoism or Titoism, with the official aim of achieving socialism and progressing toward a communist society. There have been several instances of communist states with functioning political participation (i.e. Soviet democracy) processes involving several other non-party organisations such as direct democratic participation, factory committees, and trade unions, although the communist party remained the centre of power.

As a term, communist state is used by Western historians, political scientists, and media to refer to these countries. However, these states do not describe themselves as communist nor do they claim to have achieved communism—they refer to themselves as socialist states that are in the process of constructing socialism. Terms used by communist states include national-democratic, people's democratic, socialist-oriented, and workers and peasants' states. Academics, political commentators, and other scholars tend to distinguish between communist states and democratic socialist states, with the first representing the Eastern Bloc and the latter representing Western Bloc countries that have been democratically-governed by socialist parties such as Britain, France, Sweden, and Western social-democracies in general, among others.

Overview

Development 

During the 20th century, the world's first constitutionally communist state was in Russia at the end of 1917. In 1922, it joined other former territories of the empire to become the Soviet Union. After World War II, the Soviet Army occupied much of Eastern Europe and helped bring the existing communist parties to power in those countries. Originally, the communist states in Eastern Europe were allied with the Soviet Union. Yugoslavia would declare itself non-aligned, and Albania later took a different path. After a war against Japanese occupation and a civil war resulting in a Communist victory, the People's Republic of China was established in 1949. Communist states were also established in Cambodia, Cuba, Laos, North Korea, and Vietnam. In 1989, the communist states in Eastern Europe collapsed after the Iron Curtain broke as a result of the Pan-European Picnic, under public pressure during a wave of mostly non-violent movements as part of the Revolutions of 1989 which led to the dissolution of the Soviet Union in 1991. China's socio-economic structure has been referred to as "nationalistic state capitalism" and the Eastern Bloc (Eastern Europe and the Third World) as "bureaucratic-authoritarian systems."

Today, the existing communist states in the world are in China, Cuba, Laos, Vietnam, and North Korea (DPRK). These communist states often do not claim to have achieved socialism or communism in their countries but to be building and working toward the establishment of socialism in their countries. The preamble to the Socialist Republic of Vietnam's Constitution states that Vietnam only entered a transition stage between capitalism and socialism after the country was re-unified under the communist party in 1976 and the 1992 Constitution of the Republic of Cuba states that the role of the communist party is to "guide the common effort toward the goals and construction of socialism." The DPRK's constitution outlines a socialist economy and the ruling Workers' Party of Korea remains ideologically committed to communism.

Institutions 
Communist states share similar institutions which are organised on the premise that the communist party is a vanguard of the proletariat and represents the long-term interests of the people. The doctrine of democratic centralism, developed by Vladimir Lenin as a set of principles to be used in the internal affairs of the communist party, is extended to society at large. According to democratic centralism, all leaders must be elected by the people and all proposals must be debated openly, but once a decision has been reached all people have a duty to account to that decision. When used within a political party, democratic centralism is meant to prevent factionalism and splits. When applied to an entire state, democratic centralism creates a one-party system. The constitutions of most communist states describe their political system as a form of democracy. They recognize the sovereignty of the people as embodied in a series of representative parliamentary institutions. Such states do not have a separation of powers and instead have one national legislative body (such as the Supreme Soviet in the Soviet Union) which is considered the highest organ of state power and which is legally superior to the executive and judicial branches of government.

In communist states, national legislative politics often have a similar structure to the parliaments that exist in liberal republics, with two significant differences. First, the deputies elected to these national legislative bodies are not expected to represent the interests of any particular constituency, but rather the long-term interests of the people as a whole; and second, against Karl Marx's advice, the legislative bodies of communist states are not in permanent session. Rather, they convene once or several times per year in sessions which usually last only a few days. When the national legislative body is not in session, its powers are transferred to a smaller council (often called a presidium) which combines legislative and executive power and in some communist states (such as the Soviet Union before 1990) acts as a collective head of state. In some systems, the presidium is composed of important communist party members who vote the resolutions of the communist party into law.

A feature of communist states is the existence of numerous state-sponsored social organisations (associations of journalists, teachers, writers and other professionals, consumer cooperatives, sports clubs, trade unions, youth organisations, and women's organisations) which are integrated into the political system. In communist states, the social organisations are expected to promote social unity and cohesion, to serve as a link between the government and society and to provide a forum for recruitment of new communist party members.

Historically, the political organisation of many socialist states has been dominated by a one-party monopoly. Some communist governments such as those in China, Czechoslovakia, or East Germany have or had more than one political party, but all minor parties are or were required to follow the leadership of the communist party. In communist states, the government may not tolerate criticism of policies that have already been implemented in the past or are being implemented in the present. Nevertheless, communist parties have won elections and governed in the context of multi-party democracies without seeking to establish a one-party state and therefore these entities do not fall under the definition of communist state. In most of Europe, communist parties were highly popular and served in several coalition governments during the 20th century. Examples of direct ruling include San Marino (1945–1957), Nicaragua (1984–1990), Guyana (1992–2015), Moldova (2001–2009), Cyprus (2008–2013), and Nepal (1994–1998; 2008–2013; 2015–2017; 2018–present) as well as several Brazilian, Indian (Kerala), and Russian states.

State 
According to Marxist–Leninist thought, the state is a repressive institution led by a ruling class. This class dominates the state and expresses its will through it. By formulating law, the ruling class uses the state to oppress other classes and forming a class dictatorship. However, the goal of the communist state is to abolish that said state. The Soviet Russia Constitution of 1918 stated: "The principal object of the Constitution of the R.S.F.S.R., which is adapted to the present transition period, consists in the establishment of a dictatorship of the urban and rural proletariat and the poorest peasantry, in the form of a powerful All-Russian Soviet power; the object of which is to secure complete suppression of the bourgeoisie, the abolition of exploitation of man by man, and the establishment of Socialism, under which there shall be neither class division nor state authority". The communist state is the dictatorship of the proletariat, where the advanced elements of the proletariat are the ruling class. In Marxist–Leninist thinking, the socialist state is the last repressive state since the next stage of development is that of pure communism, a classless and stateless society. Friedrich Engels commented on the state, writing: "State interference in social relations, becomes, in one domain after another, superfluous, and then dies out of itself; the government of persons is replaced by the administration of things, and by the conduct of processes of production. The state is not 'abolished'. It dies out."

In "The Tax in Kind", Vladimir Lenin argued: "No one, I think, in studying the question of the economic system of Russia, has denied its transitional character. Nor, I think, has any Communist denied that the term Soviet Socialist Republic implies the determination of the Soviet power to achieve the transition to socialism, and not that the existing economic system is recognised as a socialist order." The introduction of the first five-year plan in the Soviet Union got many communists to believe that the withering away of the state was imminent. However, Joseph Stalin warned that the withering away of the state would not occur until after the socialist mode of production had achieved dominance over capitalism. Soviet jurist Andrey Vyshinsky echoed this assumption and said that the socialist state was necessary "in order to defend, to secure, and to develop relationships and arrangements advantageous to the workers, and to annihilate completely capitalism and its remnants."

Ideology permeates these states. According to scholar Peter Tang, "[t]he supreme test of whether a Communist Party-state remains revolutionarily dedicated or degenerates into a revisionist or counterrevolutionary system lies in its attitude toward the Communist ideology." Therefore, the sole ideological purpose of communist states is to spread socialism and to reach that goal these states have to be guided by Marxism–Leninism. The communist states have opted for two ways to achieve this goal, namely govern indirectly by Marxism–Leninism through the party (Soviet model), or commit the state officially through the constitution to Marxism–Leninism (Maoist China–Albania model). The Soviet model is the most common and is currently in use in China.

Marxism–Leninism was mentioned in the Soviet constitution. Article 6 of the 1977 Soviet constitution stated: "The Communist Party, armed with Marxism–Leninism, determines the general perspective of the development of society and the course of the domestic and foreign policy of the USSR." This contrasts with the 1976 Albanian constitution which stated in Article 3: "In the People's Socialist Republic of Albania the dominant ideology is Marxism–Leninism. The entire social order is developing on the basis of its principles." The 1975 Chinese constitution had a similar tone, stating in Article 2 that "Marxism–Leninism–Mao Zedong Thought is the theoretical basis guiding the thinking of our nation." The 1977 Soviet constitution did also use phrases such as "building socialism and communism", "on the road to communism", "to build the material and technical basis of communism" and "to perfect socialist social relations and transform them into communist relations" in the preamble.

People's democratic state 
The people's democratic state was implemented in Eastern Europe after World War II. It can be defined as a state and society in which feudal vestiges have been liquidated and where the system of private ownership exists, but it is eclipsed by the state-owned enterprises in the field of industry, transport, and credit.

In the words of Eugene Varga, "the state itself and its apparatus of violence serve the interests, not of the monopolistic bourgeoisie, but of the toilers of town and country." Soviet philosopher N. P. Farberov stated: "People's democracy in the people's republics is a democracy of the toiling classes, headed by the working class, a broad and full democracy for the overwhelming majority of the people, that is, a socialist democracy in its character and its trend. In this sense we call it popular."

People's republican state 
The people's republican state is a type of socialist state with a republican constitution. Although the term initially became associated with populist movements in the 19th century such as the German Völkisch movement and the Narodniks in Russia, it is now associated with communist states. A number of the short-lived communist states which formed during World War I and its aftermath called themselves people's republics. Many of these sprang up in the territory of the former Russian Empire following the October Revolution.

Additional people's republics emerged following the Allied victory in World War II, mainly within the Soviet Union's Eastern Bloc. In Asia, China became a people's republic following the Chinese Communist Revolution and North Korea also became a people's republic.

During the 1960s, Romania and Yugoslavia ceased to use the term people's republic in their official name, replacing it with the term socialist republic as a mark of their ongoing political development. Czechoslovakia also added the term socialist republic into its name during this period. It had become a people's republic in 1948, but the country had not used that term in its official name. Albania used both terms in its official name from 1976 to 1991.

National-democratic state 
The concept of the national-democratic state tried to theorize how a state could develop socialism by bypassing the capitalist mode of production. While the theory of non-capitalist development was first articulated by Vladimir Lenin, the novelty of this concept was applying it to the progressive elements of the national liberation movements in the Third World. The term national-democratic state was introduced shortly after the death of Stalin, who believed colonies to be mere lackeys of Western imperialism and that the socialist movement had few prospects there.

The countries in which the national liberations movements took power and which instituted an anti-imperialist foreign policy and sought to construct a form of socialism were considered as national-democratic states by Marxist–Leninists. An example of a national-democratic state is Egypt under Gamal Abdel Nasser which was committed to constructing Arab socialism. With the exception of Cuba, none of these states managed to develop socialism. According to scholar Sylvia Woodby Edington, this might explain why the concept of the national-democratic state "never received full theoretical elaboration as a political system." However, one feature was clearly defined, namely, that these states did not need to be led by a Marxist–Leninist party.

Socialist-oriented state 
A socialist-oriented state seeks to reach socialism by non-capitalist development. As a term, it is substantially different from the concept of the national-democratic state. The singular difference is that the socialist-oriented state was divided into two stages, firstly, into a national-democratic socialist-oriented state and secondly, into a people's democratic socialist-oriented state. Countries belonging to the national-democratic socialist-oriented state category were also categorised as national-democratic states. Examples of national-democratic socialist-oriented states are Algeria, ruled by the National Liberation Front, Ba'athist Iraq, and Socialist Burma. In contrast, people's democratic socialist-oriented states had to be guided by Marxism–Leninism and accept the universal truths of Marxism–Leninism and reject other notions of socialism such as African socialism.

The socialist-oriented states had seven defining features, namely, they were revolutionary democracies, had a revolutionary-democratic party, class dictatorship, defense of the socialist-oriented states, had organs of socialisation, initiated socialist construction, and the type of socialist-oriented state (either national-democratic or people's democratic). The political goal of revolutionary democracy is to create the conditions for socialism in countries where the social, political, and economic conditions for socialism do not exist. The second feature to be met is the establishment of a revolutionary-democratic party which has to establish itself as the leading force and guide the state by using Marxist–Leninist ideology. While introduced in these states, democratic centralism is rarely upheld.

Unlike capitalism which is ruled by the bourgeoisie class and socialism were the proletariat leads, the socialist-oriented state represents a broad and heterogeneous group of classes that seek to consolidate national independence. Since the peasantry were usually the largest class in socialist-oriented states, their role were emphasised—similar to the working class in other socialist states. However, Marxist–Leninists admitted that these states often fell under the control of certain cliques such as the military in Ethiopia. The establishing of a legal system and coercive institutions are also noted to safeguard the socialist-oriented nature of the state. The fifth feature is that the media and educational system has to be taken over by the socialist-oriented state while establishing mass organisations to mobilize the populace. Unlike the Soviet economic model, the economy of the socialist-oriented states are mixed economies that seek to attract foreign capital and which seeks to maintain and develop the private sector. In the words of Soviet leader Leonid Brezhnev, these states were in the process of taking over the commanding heights of the economy and instituting a state planned economy. According to Soviet sources, Laos was the one socialist-oriented state that has managed to develop into a socialist state.

Socialist state 
A socialist state is more than a form of government and can only exist in countries with a socialist economy. There are examples of several states that have instituted a socialist form of government before achieving socialism. The former socialist states of Eastern Europe were established as people's democracies (a developmental stage between capitalism and socialism). On the question of the Marxist–Leninist-ruled countries of Africa and the Middle East, the Soviet Union deemed none of them to be socialist states—referring to them as socialist-oriented states. While many countries with constitutional references to socialism and countries ruled by long-standing socialist movements exist, within Marxist–Leninist theory a socialist state is led by a communist party that has instituted a socialist economy in a given country. It deals with states that define themselves either as a socialist state or as a state led by a governing Marxist–Leninist party in their constitutions. For this reason alone, these states are often called communist states.

Political system

Government 
The highest administrative agency of state power is the government. It functions as the executive organ of the legislature. The Supreme Soviet has been introduced with variations in all communist states. For most of its existence, the Soviet government was known as the Council of Ministers and identical names were used for the governments of Albania, East Germany, Hungary, Poland, and Romania. It was independent of the other central agencies such as the legislature and its standing committee, but the Supreme Soviet was empowered to decide on all questions it wished. The Soviet government was responsible to the legislature and in between sessions of the legislature it reported to the legislature's standing committee. The standing committee could reorganise and hold the Soviet government accountable, but it could not instruct the government.

In communist states, the government was responsible for the overall economic system, public order, foreign relations, and defense. The Soviet model was more or less identically implemented in Bulgaria, Czechoslovakia, East Germany, Hungary, Poland, and Romania, with few exceptions. One exception was Czechoslovakia, where it had a president and not a collective head of state. Another exception was in Bulgaria, where the State Council was empowered to instruct the Council of Ministers.

Legislature

Powers and organisation 

All state power is unified in the legislature in communist states. This is a firm rejection of the separation of powers found in constitutional democracies. The constitution is passed by the legislature and can only be amended by the legislature. Judicial review and extra-parliamentary review were denounced by Soviet legal theorists as bourgeoisie institutions. They also perceived it as a limitation of the people's supreme power. The legislature, together with its suborgans, was responsible for overseeing the constitutional order. Since the legislature is the supreme judge of constitutionality, the legislature's own acts cannot, therefore, be unconstitutional.

The Supreme Soviet was the first socialist legislature and the Soviet legislative system has been introduced in all communist states. The Supreme Soviet convened twice a year, usually for two or three days each, making it one of the world's first frequently-convened legislatures during its existence. The same meeting frequency was the norm in the Eastern Bloc countries as well as modern-day China. China's legislature, the National People's Congress (NPC), is modeled on the Soviet one. As with the Soviet one, the NPC is the highest organ of the state and elects a Standing Committee (the Soviets had a Presidium), the government, and the State Council (the Soviet counterpart being the Council of Ministers). In addition, in all communist states the ruling party has either had a clear majority such as China, or held every seat as they did in the Soviet Union in their Supreme Soviet.

Western researchers have devoted little attention to legislatures in communist states. The reason being that there are not significant bodies of political socialisation when compared to legislatures in constitutional democracies. While political leaders in communist states are often elected as members of legislatures, these posts are not relevant to political advancement. The role of legislatures is different from country to country. In the Soviet Union, the Supreme Soviet did "little more than listen to statements from Soviet political leaders and to legitimate decisions already made elsewhere" while in the legislatures of Poland, Vietnam, and Yugoslavia it has been more active and had an impact on rule-making.

Representativity 
Both Marx and Lenin abhorred the parliamentary systems of bourgeois democracy, but neither of them sought to abolish it. Lenin wrote that it would be impossible to develop proletarian democracy "without representative institutions." Both of them considered the governing model of the Paris Commune of 1871, in which executive and legislative were combined in one body, to be ideal. More importantly, Marx applauded the election process by "universal suffrage in the various wards and town." While the institution of such a legislature might not be important in itself, they "have a place in the literature and rhetoric of the ruling parties which cannot be ignored—in the language of the party's intimacy with working masses, of its alleged knowledge about interests of working people, of social justice and socialist democracy, of the mass line and learning from the people."

By having legislatures, the Marxist–Leninist parties try to keep ideological consistency between supporting representative institutions and safeguarding the leading role of the party. They seek to use the legislatures as a linkage between the rulers and the ruled. These institutions are representative and usually mirror the population in areas such as ethnicity and language, "yet with occupations distributed in a manner skewed towards government officials." Unlike in constitutional democracies, legislatures of communist states are not to act as a forum for conveying demands or interest articulation—they meet too infrequently for this to be the case. This might explain why communist states have not developed terms such as delegates and trustees to give legislature representatives the power to vote according to their best judgement or in the interest of their constituency. Scholar Daniel Nelson has noted: "As with the British parliament before the seventeenth-century turmoil secured its supremacy, legislative bodies in communist states physically portray the 'realm' ruled by (to stretch an analogy) 'kings'. Members of the assemblies 'represent' the population to whom the rulers speak and over whom they govern, convening a broader 'segment of society' [...] than the court itself." Despite this, it does not mean that the communist states use legislatures to strengthen their communication with the populace—the party, rather than the legislature, could take that function.

Ideologically, it has another function, namely, to prove that communist states do not only represent the interests of the working class, but all social strata. Communist states are committed to establishing a classless society and use legislatures to show that all social strata, whether bureaucrat, worker, or intellectual, are committed and have interests in building such a society. As is the case in China, national institutions such as the legislature "must exist which brings together representatives of all nationalities and geographic areas." It does not matter if the legislatures only rubber stamp decisions because by having them, it shows that communist states are committed to incorporating minorities and areas of the country by including them in the composition of the legislature. In communist states, there is usually a high proportion of members who are government officials. In this instance, it might mean that it's less important what legislatures do and more important who its representatives are. The members of such legislatures at central and local level are usually either government or party officials, leading figures in their community, or national figures outside the communist party. This goes to show that legislatures are tools to garner popular support for the government in which leading figures campaign and spread information about the party's policies and ideological development.

Military

Control 
Communist states have established two types of civil-military systems. The armed forces of most socialist states have historically been state institutions based on the Soviet model, but in China, Laos, North Korea, and Vietnam, the armed forces are party-state institutions. However, there are several differences between the statist (Soviet) model and the party-state model (China). In the Soviet model, the Soviet armed forces was led by the Council of Defense (an organ formed by the Presidium of the Supreme Soviet of the Soviet Union) while the Council of Ministers was responsible for formulating defense policies. The party leader was ex officio the Chairman of the Council of Defense. Below the Council of Defense, there was the Main Military Council which was responsible for the strategic direction and leadership of the Soviet armed forces. The working organ of the Council of Defense was the General Staff which was tasked with analysing military and political situations as they developed. The party controlled the armed forces through the Main Political Directorate (MPD) of the Ministry of Defense, a state organ that functioned "with the authority of a department of the CPSU Central Committee." The MPD organised political indoctrination and created political control mechanisms at the center to the company level in the field. Formally, the MPD was responsible for organising party and Komsomol organs as well as subordinate organs within the armed forces; ensuring that the party and state retain control over the armed forces; evaluates the political performance of officers; supervising the ideological content of the military press; and supervising the political-military training institutes and their ideological content. The head of the MPD was ranked fourth in military protocol, but it was not a member of the Council of Defense. The Administrative Organs Department of the CPSU Central Committee was responsible for implementing the party personnel policies and supervised the KGB, the Ministry of Internal Affairs and the Ministry of Defense.

In the Chinese party-state model, the People's Liberation Army (PLA) is a party institution. In the preamble of the Constitution of the Chinese Communist Party, it is stated: "The Communist Party of China (CPC) shall uphold its absolute leadership over the People's Liberation Army and other people's armed forces." The PLA carries out its work in accordance with the instructions of the Central Committee of the Chinese Communist Party. Mao Zedong described the PLA's institutional situation as follows: "Every communist must grasp the truth, 'Political power grows out of the barrel of a gun.' Our principle is that the party commands the gun, and the gun must never be allowed to command the Party." The Central Military Commission (CMC) is both an organ of the state and the party—it is an organ of the CCP Central Committee and an organ of the national legislature, the National People's Congress. The CCP General Secretary is ex officio party CMC Chairman and the President of the People's Republic of China is by right state CMC Chairman. The composition of the party CMC and the state CMC are identical. The CMC is responsible for the command of the PLA and determines national defense policies. There are fifteen departments that report directly to the CMC and that are responsible for everything from political work to administration of the PLA. Of significance is that the CMC eclipses by far the prerogatives of the CPSU Administrative Organs Department while the Chinese counterpart to the Main Political Directorate supervises not only the military, but also intelligence, the security services, and counterespionage work.

Representation 
Unlike in constitutional democracies, active military personnel are members and partake in civilian institutions of governance. This is the case in all communist states. The Communist Party of Vietnam (CPV) has elected at least one active military figure to its CPV Politburo since 1986. In the 1986–2006 period, active military figures sitting in the CPV Central Committee stood at an average of 9,2 percent. Military figures are also represented in the national legislature (the National Assembly) and other representative institutions. In China, the two CMC vice chairmen have had by right office seats in the CCP Politburo since 1987.

Ruling party

Leading role 
Every communist state has been led by a Marxist–Leninist party. This party seeks to represent and articulate the interests of the classes exploited by capitalism. It seeks to lead the exploited classes to achieve communism. However, the party cannot be identified with the exploited class in general. Its membership is composed of members with advanced consciousness who are above sectional interests. Therefore, the party represents the advanced section of the exploited classes and through them leads the exploited classes by interpreting the universal laws governing human history towards communism.

In Foundations of Leninism (1924), Joseph Stalin wrote that "the proletariat [working class] needs the Party first of all as its General Staff, which it must have for the successful seizure of power. [...] But the proletariat needs the Party not only to achieve the [class] dictatorship; it needs it still more to maintain the [class] dictatorship." The current Constitution of Vietnam states in Article 4 that "[t]he Communist Party of Vietnam, the vanguard of the Vietnamese working class, simultaneously the vanguard of the toiling people and of the Vietnamese nation, the faithful representative of the interests of the working class, the toiling people, and the whole nation, acting upon the Marxist–Leninist doctrine and Ho Chi Minh's thought, is the leading force of the state and society." In a similar form, the Chinese Communist Party (CCP) describes itself as "the vanguard of the Chinese working class, the Chinese people, and the Chinese nation." As noted by both communist parties, the ruling parties of communist states are vanguard parties. Vladimir Lenin theorised that vanguard parties were "capable of assuming power and leading the whole people to socialism, of directing and organising the new system, of being the teacher, the guide, the leader of all the working and exploited people in organising their social life without the bourgeoisie." This idea eventually evolved into the concept of the party's leading role in leading the state as seen in the CCP's self-description and Vietnam's constitution.

Internal organisation 
The Marxist–Leninist governing party organises itself around the principle of democratic centralism and through it the state too. It means that all directing bodies of the party, from top to bottom, shall be elected; that party bodies shall give periodical accounts of their activities to their respective party organisations; that there shall be strict party discipline and the subordination of the minority to the majority; and that all decisions of higher bodies shall be absolutely binding on lower bodies and on all party members.

The highest organ of a Marxist–Leninist governing party is the party congress. The congress elects the central committee and either an auditing commission and a control commission, or both, although not always. The central committee is the party's highest decision-making organ in-between party congresses and elects a politburo and a secretariat amongst its members as well as the party's leader. When the central committee is not in session, the politburo is the highest decision-making organ of the party and the secretariat is the highest administrative organ. In certain parties, either the central committee or the politburo elects amongst its members a standing committee of the politburo which acts as the highest decision-making organ in between sessions of the politburo, central committee, and the congress. This leadership structure is identical all the way down to the primary party organisation of the ruling party.

Economic system 
From reading their works, many followers of Karl Marx and Friedrich Engels drew the idea that the socialist economy would be based on planning and not market mechanism. These ideas later developed into the belief that planning was superior to market mechanism. Upon seizing power, the Bolsheviks began advocating a national state planning system. The 8th Congress of the Russian Communist Party (Bolsheviks) resolved to institute "the maximum centralisation of production [...] simultaneously striving to establish a unified economic plan." The Gosplan, the State Planning Commission, the Supreme Soviet of the National Economy, and other central planning organs were established during the 1920s in the era of the New Economic Policy. On introducing the planning system, it became a common belief in the international communist movement that the Soviet planning system was a more advanced form of economic organisation than capitalism. This led to the system being introduced voluntarily in countries such as China, Cuba, and Vietnam and in some cases imposed by the Soviet Union.

In communist states, the state planning system had five main characteristics. Firstly, with the exception of the field consumption and employment, practically all decisions were centralized at the top. Secondly, the system was hierarchical—the center formulated a plan that was sent down to the level below which would imitate the process and send the plan further down the pyramid. Thirdly, the plans were binding in nature, i.e. everyone had to follow and meet the goals set forth in it. Fourthly, the predominance of calculating in physical terms to ensure planned allocation of commodities were not incompatible with planned production. Finally, money played a passive role within the state sector since the planners focused on physical allocation.

According to Michael Ellman, in a centrally-planned economy "the state owns the land and all other natural resources and all characteristics of the traditional model, the enterprises, and their productive assets. Collective ownership (e.g. the property of collective farms) also exists, but plays a subsidiary role, and is expected to be temporary." The private ownership of the means of production still exist, although it plays a fairly smaller role. Since the class struggle in capitalism is caused by the division between owners of the means of production and the workers who sell their labour, state ownership (defined as the property of the people in these systems) is considered as a tool to end the class struggle and empower the working class.

Judicial system

Constitution

Role of constitutions 
Marxist–Leninists view the constitution as a fundamental law and as an instrument of force. The constitution is the source of law and legality. Unlike in constitutional democracies, the Marxist–Leninist constitution is not a framework to limit the power of the state. To the contrary, a Marxist–Leninist constitution seeks to empower the state—believing the state to be an organ of class domination and law to be the expression of the interests of the dominant class. It is the belief of Marxist–Leninists that all national constitutions do this to ensure that countries can strengthen and enforce their own class system. In this instance, it means that Marxist–Leninists conceive of constitutions as a tool to defend the socialist nature of the state and attack its enemies. This contrasts with the liberal conception of constitutionalism that "law, rather than men, is supreme."

Unlike the relatively constant (and, in some instances, permanently fixed) nature of democratic constitutions, a Marxist–Leninist constitution is ever-changing. Andrey Vyshinsky, a Procurator General of the Soviet Union during the 1930s, notes that the "Soviet constitutions represent the sum total of the historic path along which the Soviet state has traveled. At the same time, they are the legislative basis of subsequent development of state life." That is, the constitution sums up what already has been achieved. This belief is also shared by the Chinese Communist Party which argued that "the Chinese Constitution blazes a path for China, recording what has been won in China and what is yet to be conquered." A constitution in a communist state has an end. The preamble of the 1954 Chinese constitution outlines the historical tasks of the Chinese communists, "step by step, to bring about the socialist industrialisation of the country and, step by step, to accomplish the socialist transformation of agriculture, handicraft and capitalist industry and commerce."

In communist states, the constitution was a tool to analyse the development of society. The Marxist–Leninist party in question would have to study the correlation of forces, literally society's class structure, before enacting changes. Several terms were coined for different developmental states by Marxist–Leninists legal theorists, including new democracy, people's democracy, and the primary stage of socialism. This is also why amendments to constitutions are not enough and major societal changes need a novel constitution which corresponds with the reality of the new class structure.

With Nikita Khrushchev's repudiation of Stalin's practices in the "Secret Speech" and the Chinese Communist Party's repudiation of certain Maoist policies, Marxist–Leninist legal theories began to emphasise "the formal, formerly neglected constitutional order." Deng Xiaoping, not long after Chairman Mao Zedong's death, noted that "[d]emocracy has to be institutionalised and written into law, so as to make sure that institutions and laws do not change whenever the leadership changes or whenever the leaders change their views. [...] The trouble now is that our legal system is incomplete. [...] Very often what leaders say is taken as law and anyone who disagrees is called a lawbreaker." In 1986, Li Buyan wrote that "the policies of the Party usually are regulations and calls which to a certain extent are only principles. The law is different; it is rigorously standardised. It explicitly and concretely stipulates what the people should, can, or cannot do." These legal developments have been echoed in later years in Cuba, Laos, and Vietnam. This has led to the development of the communist concept of socialist rule of law which runs parallel to, and is distinct from, the liberal term of the same name. In the last years, this emphasis on the constitution as both a legal document and a paper which documents society's development has been noted by Chinese Communist Party general secretary Xi Jinping, who stated in 2013 that "[n]o organisation or individual has the privilege to overstep the Constitution and law."

Constitutional supervision 
After Soviet Union general secretary Joseph Stalin's death, several communist states have experimented with some sort of constitutional supervision. These organs were designed to safeguard the supreme power of the legislature from circumvention by political leaders. Romania was the first to experiment with constitutional supervision when it established a Constitutional Committee in 1965. It was elected by the legislature and leading jurists sat in the committee, but it was only empowered to advise the legislature. Keith Hand has commented that "[i]t was not an effective institution in practice," being unable to prevent Nicolae Ceausescu's emasculation of Romania's Great National Assembly after the inauguration of the July Theses.

Hungary and Poland experimented with constitutional supervision in the early 1980s. Hungary established the Council of Constitutional Law which was elected by the legislature and consisted of several leading jurists. It was empowered to review the constitutionality and legality of statutes, administrative regulations, and other normative documents; however, if the agency in question failed to heed its advice, it needed to petition the legislature. In 1989, the Soviets established the Constitutional Supervision Committee which "was subordinate only to the USSR constitution." It was empowered "to review the constitutionality and legality of a range of state acts of the USSR and its republics. Its jurisdiction included laws [passed by the legislature], decrees of the Supreme Soviet's Presidium, union republic constitutions and laws, some central administrative decrees, Supreme Court explanations, and other central normative documents." If the committee deemed the legislature to have breached legality, the legislature was obliged to discuss the issue, but it could reject it if more than two-thirds voted against the findings of the Constitutional Supervision Committee. While it was constitutionally powerful, it lacked enforcement powers, it was often ignored and it failed to defend the constitution during the coup against Mikhail Gorbachev.

The Chinese leadership has argued against establishing any corresponding constitutional supervisory committee due to their association with the failed communist states of Europe. None of the surviving communist states (China, Cuba, Laos, and Vietnam) have experimented with constitutional supervision committees or constitutional supervision of any kind outside the existing framework.

Legal system 

All communist states have been established in countries with a civil law system. The countries of Eastern Europe had formally been governed by the Austro-Hungarian Empire, German Empire, and Russian Empire—all of whom had a civil law legal system. Cuba had a civil law system imposed on them by Spain while China introduced civil law to overlay with Confucian elements and Vietnam used French law. Since the establishment of the Soviet Union, there has been a scholarly debate on whether socialist law is a separate legal system or is a part of the civil law tradition. Legal scholar Renè David wrote that the socialist legal system "possesses, in relation to our French law, particular features that give it a complete originality, to the extent that it is no longer possible to connect it, like the former Russian law, to the system of Roman law." Similarly, Christoper Osakwe concludes that socialist law is "an autonomous legal system to be essentially distinguished from the other contemporary families of law." Proponents of socialist law as a separate legal system, have identified the following features:
 The socialist law is to disappear with the withering away of the state.
 The rule of the Marxist–Leninist party.
 The socialist law is subordinate and reflects changes to the economic order (the absorption of private law by public law).
 The socialist law has a religious character.
 The socialist law is prerogative rather than normative.

Legal officials argue differently for their case compared to Westerners. For instance, "[t]he predominant view among Soviet jurists in the 1920s was that Soviet law of that period was Western-style law appropriate for a Soviet economy that remained capitalist to a significant degree." This changed with the introduction of the command economy and the term socialist law was conceived to reflect this in the 1930s. Hungarian legal theorist Imre Szabó acknowledged similarities between socialist law and civil law, but he noted that "four basic types of law may be distinguished: the laws of the slave, feudal, capitalist, and socialist societies." Using the Marxist theory of historical materialism, Szabó argues that socialist law cannot belong to the same law family since the material structure is different from the capitalist countries as their superstructure (state) has to reflect these differences. In other words, law is a tool by the ruling class to govern. As Renè David notes, socialist jurists "isolate their law, to put into another category, a reprobate category, the Romanist laws and the common law, is the fact that they reason less as jurists and more as philosophers and Marxists; it is in taking a not strictly legal viewpoint that they affirm the originality of their socialist law." However, some socialist legal theorists such as Romanian jurist Victor Zlatescu differentiated between type of law and family of law. According to Zlatescu, "[t]he distinction between the law of the socialist countries and the law of the capitalist countries is not of the same nature as the difference between Roman-German law and the common law, for example. Socialist law is not a third family among the others, as appears in certain writings of Western comparatists." In other words, socialist law is civil law, but it is a different type of law for a different type of society.

Yugoslav jurist Borislav Blagojevic noted that a "great number of legal institutions and legal relations remain the same in socialist law", further stating that it is "necessary and justified" to put them to use if they are "in conformity with the corresponding interests of the ruling class in the state in question." Importantly, socialist law has retained civil law institutions, methodology, and organisation. This can be discerned by the fact that East Germany retained the 1896 German civil code until 1976 while Poland used existing Austrian, French, German, and Russian civil codes until its adoption of its own civil code in 1964. Scholar John Quigley wrote that "[s]ocialist law retains the inquisitorial style of trial, law-creation predominantly by legislatures rather than courts, and a significant role for legal scholarship in construing codes."

List of communist states

Current communist states 

The following countries are one-party states in which the institutions of the ruling communist party and the state have become intertwined. They are adherents of Marxism–Leninism. They are listed here together with the year of their founding and their respective ruling parties.

Multi-party states with governing communist parties 

There are multi-party states with communist parties leading the government. Such states are not considered to be communist states because the countries themselves allow for multiple parties and do not provide a constitutional role for their communist parties. Nepal was previously ruled by the Nepal Communist Party, the Communist Party of Nepal (Unified Marxist–Leninist), and the Unified Communist Party of Nepal (Maoist) between 1994 and 1998 and then again between 2008 and 2018 while states formerly ruled by one or more communist parties include San Marino (1945–1957), Nicaragua (1984–1990), Moldova (2001–2009), Cyprus (2008–2013), and Guyana (1992–2015).

Venezuela is currently ruled by Nicolás Maduro, who has been President since 2013 (disputed since 2019). Maduro is the leader of the United Socialist Party of Venezuela (PSUV), which is considered far-left and Marxist.

During the socialist Free Peru party's rule over Peru, many international observers described the party as being somewhat Marxist or even Marxist–Leninist.

Former communist states 

The following communist states were socialist states committed to communism. Some were short-lived and preceded the widespread adoption of Marxism–Leninism by most communist states.
  Russia
  Chita Republic (1905-1906)
  Russian Soviet Federative Socialist Republic (1917–1991)
  Amur Socialist Soviet Republic (1918)
  Turkestan Autonomous Soviet Socialist Republic (1918–1924)
  Volga German Autonomous Soviet Socialist Republic (1918–1941)
  Bashkir Autonomous Soviet Socialist Republic (1919–1991)
  Tatar Autonomous Soviet Socialist Republic (1920–1990)
  Kirghiz Autonomous Socialist Soviet Republic (1920–1925)
  Mountain Autonomous Soviet Socialist Republic (1921–1924)
  Dagestan Autonomous Soviet Socialist Republic (1921–1991)
  Crimean Autonomous Soviet Socialist Republic (1921–1941; 1944–1945)
  Yakut Autonomous Soviet Socialist Republic (1922–1991)
  Buryat Autonomous Soviet Socialist Republic (1923–1990)
  Karelian Autonomous Soviet Socialist Republic (1923–1940; 1956–1991)
  Kazakh Autonomous Socialist Soviet Republic (1925–1936)
  Kirghiz Autonomous Socialist Soviet Republic (1926–1936)
  Mordovian Autonomous Soviet Socialist Republic (1934–1990)
  Udmurt Autonomous Soviet Socialist Republic (1934–1990)
  Kalmyk Autonomous Soviet Socialist Republic (1935–1943; 1957–1991)
  Checheno-Ingush Autonomous Soviet Socialist Republic (1936–1944; 1957–1991)
  Kabardino-Balkarian Autonomous Soviet Socialist Republic (1936–1944; 1957–1991)
  Komi Autonomous Soviet Socialist Republic (1936–1991)
  Mari Autonomous Soviet Socialist Republic (1936–1991)
  North Ossetian Autonomous Soviet Socialist Republic (1936–1993)
  Karelo-Finnish Soviet Socialist Republic (1940–1956)
  Kabardin Autonomous Soviet Socialist Republic (1944–1957)
  Tuvan Autonomous Soviet Socialist Republic (1961–1992)
  Gorno-Altai Autonomous Soviet Socialist Republic (1990–1991)
  Soviet Republic of Soldiers and Fortress-Builders of Naissaar (1917–1918)
  Donetsk–Krivoy Rog Soviet Republic (1918)
  Crimean Socialist Soviet Republic (1919)
  Far Eastern Republic (1920–1922)
  Tuvan People's Republic (1921–1944)
  Union of Soviet Socialist Republics (1922–1991)
  Ukraine
  Ukrainian People's Republic of Soviets (1917-1918)
  Odessa Soviet Republic (1918)
  Donetsk–Krivoy Rog Soviet Republic (1918)
  Crimean Socialist Soviet Republic (1919)
  Galician Soviet Socialist Republic (1920)
  Union of Soviet Socialist Republics (1922–1991)
  Ukrainian Soviet Socialist Republic (1919–1991)
  Moldavian Autonomous Soviet Socialist Republic (1924–1940)
  Crimean Autonomous Soviet Socialist Republic (1991–1992)
  Finland
  Finnish Socialist Workers' Republic (1918)
  Finnish Democratic Republic (1939–1940)
  Karelo-Finnish Soviet Socialist Republic (1940–1956)
  Germany
  Münster rebellion (1534-1535)
  Free Socialist Republic of Germany (1918–1919)
  Mainz Workers' and Soldiers' Council 1918
  Saxony Soviet (1918–1919)
  Bremen Soviet Republic (1919)
  Bavarian Soviet Republic (1919)
  Würzburg Soviet Republic (1919)
  People's State of Bavaria (1918-1919)
  Soviet occupation of Germany (1945–1949)
  Soviet occupation of Berlin (1945–1949)
  German Democratic Republic (1949–1990)
  East Berlin (1949–1990)
  France
  June Rebellion (1831)
  Communard France (1870-1871)
  Second Paris Commune (1870)
  Lyon Commune (1870-1871)
  Third Paris Commune (1871)
  Besançon Commune (1871)
  Alsace-Lorraine Soviet Republic (1918)
  Estonia
  Commune of the Working People of Estonia (1918–1919)
  First Soviet occupation of the Baltic states (1940–1941)
  Second Soviet occupation of the Baltic states (1944–1945)
  Estonian Soviet Socialist Republic (1944–1991)
  Latvia
  Executive Committee of the Soviet of Workers, Soldiers, and the Landless in Latvia (1917-1918)
  Latvian Socialist Soviet Republic (1918–1920)
  Latvian Soviet Socialist Republic (1944–1991)
  Lithuania
  Lithuanian Soviet Socialist Republic (1918-1919)
  Lithuanian–Byelorussian Soviet Socialist Republic (1919)
  First Soviet occupation of the Baltic states (1940–1941)
  Second Soviet occupation of the Baltic states (1944–1945)
  Lithuanian Soviet Socialist Republic (1944–1991)
  Belarus
  Lithuanian–Byelorussian Soviet Socialist Republic (1919)
  Byelorussian Soviet Socialist Republic (1922–1991)
  Hungary
  Hungarian Soviet Republic (1919)
  Serbian–Hungarian Baranya–Baja Republic (1921)
  Soviet occupation of Hungary (1944–1946)
  Second Hungarian Republic (1946–1949)
  Hungarian People's Republic (1949–1989)
  Azerbaijan
  Baku Commune (1918)
  Mughan Soviet Republic (1919)
  Azerbaijan Soviet Socialist Republic (1920–1991)
  Nakhichevan Autonomous Soviet Socialist Republic (1921–1990)
  Transcaucasian Socialist Federative Soviet Republic (1922–1936)
  Czechoslovakia
  Slovak Soviet Republic (1919)
  Soviet occupation of Czechoslovakia (1944–1948)
  Fourth Czechoslovak Republic (1948–1960)
  Czechoslovak Socialist Republic (1960–1990)
  Tajikistan
  Bukharan People's Soviet Republic (1920–1925)
  Tajik Soviet Socialist Republic (1929–1991)
  Turkmenistan
  Khorezm People's Soviet Republic (1920–1925)
  Bukharan People's Soviet Republic (1920–1925)
  Turkmen Soviet Socialist Republic (1925–1991)
  Uzbekistan
  Khorezm People's Soviet Republic (1920–1925)
  Bukharan People's Soviet Republic (1920–1925)
  Uzbek Soviet Socialist Republic (1924–1991)
  Tajik Autonomous Soviet Socialist Republic (1924–1929)
  Karakalpak Autonomous Soviet Socialist Republic (1932–1991)
  Iran
  Persian Socialist Soviet Republic (1920–1921)
  Soviet occupation of Iran (1941–1946)
  Azerbaijan People's Government (1945–1946)
  Republic of Mahabad (1946–1947)
  Poland
  Provisional Polish Revolutionary Committee
  Galician Soviet Socialist Republic (1920)
  Provisional Government of National Unity (1945–1947)
  Polish People's Republic (1947–1989)
  Armenia
  Armenian Soviet Socialist Republic (1920–1991)
  Transcaucasian Socialist Federative Soviet Republic (1922–1936)
  Georgia
  Georgian Soviet Socialist Republic (1921–1991)
  Adjar Autonomous Soviet Socialist Republic (1921–1990)
  Abkhaz Autonomous Soviet Socialist Republic (1931–1996)
  Transcaucasian Socialist Federative Soviet Republic (1922–1936)
  Mongolia
  People's Republic of Mongolia (1921–1924)
  Mongolian People's Republic (1924–1992)
  China
  Hailufeng Soviet (1927)
  Hunan Soviet (1927)
  Guangzhou Commune (1927)
  Soviet Zone of China (1927–1949)
  (1931–1937)
  Jiangxi–Fujian Soviet (1931–1934)
  People's Revolutionary Government of the Republic of China (1933–1934)
  Northwest Chinese Soviet Federation (1935-1936)
  Tibetan People's Republic (1936)
  Second East Turkestan Republic (1944–1949)
  Inner Mongolian People's Republic (1945)
  Soviet occupation of Manchuria (1945–1946)
  Spain
  Asturian Socialist Republic (1934)
  Kazakhstan
  Kazakh Soviet Socialist Republic (1936–1991)
  Kyrgyzstan
  Kirghiz Soviet Socialist Republic (1936–1991)
  Romania
  Soviet occupation of Bessarabia and northern Bukovina (1940)
  Soviet occupation of Romania (1944–1947)
  Romanian People's Republic (1947–1965)
  Socialist Republic of Romania (1965–1989)
  Moldova
  Moldavian Soviet Socialist Republic (1940–1991)
  Pridnestrovian Moldavian Soviet Socialist Republic (1990–1991)
  Greece
  Political Committee of National Liberation (1944–1949)
  Provisional Democratic Government (1947-1949)
  Albania
  Democratic Government of Albania (1944–1946)
  People's Republic of Albania (1946–1976)
  People's Socialist Republic of Albania (1976–1992)
  Bulgaria
  Strandzha Commune (1903)
  Soviet occupation of Bulgaria (1944–1946)
  People's Republic of Bulgaria (1946–1990)
  Norway
  Soviet occupation of Northern Norway (1944–1946)
  Austria
  Soviet occupation of Austria (1945–1946)
  Soviet occupation of Vienna (1945–1946)
  Denmark
  Soviet occupation of Bornholm (1945–1946)
  Japan
  Soviet occupation of the Kuril Islands (1945)
  Korea
  Soviet Civil Administration (1945–1946)
  Provisional People's Committee of North Korea (1946–1947)
  People's Committee of North Korea (1947–1948)
  Democratic People's Republic of Korea (1948–1992/2009)
  Yugoslavia
  Federal People's Republic of Yugoslavia (1945–1963)
  Socialist Federal Republic of Yugoslavia (1963–1992)
  Colombia
  Marquetalia Republic (1948–1958)
  Vietnam
  Nghệ-Tĩnh Soviet
  Democratic Republic of Vietnam (1954–1975)
  Provisional Revolutionary Government of the Republic of South Vietnam (1969–1976)
  Yemen
  People's Democratic Republic of Yemen (1967–1990)
  Sudan
  Democratic Republic of the Sudan (1969–1985)
  Somalia
  Somali Democratic Republic (1969–1991)
  Republic of the Congo
  People's Republic of the Congo (1969–1992)
  Ethiopia
  Provisional Military Government of Socialist Ethiopia (1974–1987)
 People's Democratic Republic of Ethiopia (1987–1991)
  Mozambique
  People's Republic of Mozambique (1975–1990)
  Angola
  People's Republic of Angola (1975–1992)
  Benin
  People's Republic of Benin (1975–1990)
  Cambodia
  Democratic Kampuchea (1976–1979)
  People's Republic of Kampuchea (1979–1989)
  State of Cambodia (1989–1992)
  Coalition Government of Democratic Kampuchea (1982–1992)
  Provisional Government of National Union and National Salvation of Cambodia (1994–1998)
  Afghanistan
  Democratic Republic of Afghanistan (1978–1987)
  Republic of Afghanistan (1987–1992)
  Grenada
  People's Revolutionary Government of Grenada (1979–1983)
  Burkina Faso
  Burkina Faso (1984–1987)
  Turkey
  Strandzha Commune (1903)
  Brazil
  National Liberation Alliance of Brazil
  Seychelles
  Republic of Seychelles

Analysis 

Countries such as the Soviet Union and China were criticised by Western authors and organisations on the basis of the lack of the representative nature of multi-party constitutional democracy, in addition to several other areas where socialist society and Western societies differed. Socialist societies were commonly characterised by state ownership or social ownership of the means of production either through administration through communist party organisations, democratically elected councils and communes, and co-operative structures—in opposition to the liberal democratic capitalist free-market paradigm of management, ownership and control by corporations and private individuals. Communist states have also been criticised for the influence and outreach of their respective ruling parties on society, in addition to lack of recognition for some Western legal rights and liberties such as the right to own property and the restriction of the right to free speech. The early economic development policies of communist states have been criticised for focusing primarily on the development of heavy industry.

Soviet advocates and socialists responded to criticism by highlighting the ideological differences in the concept of freedom. McFarland and Ageyev noted that "Marxist–Leninist norms disparaged laissez-faire individualism (as when housing is determined by one's ability to pay), also [condemning] wide variations in personal wealth as the West has not. Instead, Soviet ideals emphasized equality—free education and medical care, little disparity in housing or salaries, and so forth." When asked to comment on the claim that former citizens of communist states enjoy increased freedoms, Heinz Kessler, former East German Minister of National Defence, replied: "Millions of people in Eastern Europe are now free from employment, free from safe streets, free from health care, free from social security."

In his analysis of states run under Marxist–Leninist ideology, economist Michael Ellman of the University of Amsterdam notes that such states compared favorably with Western states in some health indicators such as infant mortality and life expectancy. Philipp Ther posits that there was an increase in the standard of living throughout Eastern Bloc countries as the result of modernisation programs under communist governments. Similarly, Amartya Sen's own analysis of international comparisons of life expectancy found that several Marxist–Leninist states made significant gains and commented "one thought that is bound to occur is that communism is good for poverty removal." The dissolution of the Soviet Union was followed by a rapid increase in poverty, crime, corruption, unemployment, homelessness, rates of disease, infant mortality, domestic violence, and income inequality, along with decreases in calorie intake, life expectancy, adult literacy, and income.

Memory 
Monuments to the victims of communist states exist in almost all the capitals of Eastern Europe and there are several museums documenting communist rule such as the Museum of Occupations and Freedom Fights in Lithuania, the Museum of the Occupation of Latvia in Riga, and the House of Terror in Budapest, all three of which also document Nazi rule. In Washington D.C., a bronze statue based upon the 1989 Tiananmen Square Goddess of Democracy sculpture was dedicated as the Victims of Communism Memorial in 2007, having been authorized by the United States Congress in 1993. The Victims of Communism Memorial Foundation plans to build an International Museum on Communism in Washington. As of 2008, Russia contained 627 memorials and memorial plaques dedicated to victims of the communist states, most of which were created by private citizens and did not have a national monument or a national museum. The Wall of Grief in Moscow, inaugurated in October 2017, is Russia's first monument for victims of political persecution by Stalin during the country's Soviet era. In 2017, Canada's National Capital Commission approved the design for a memorial to the victims of communism to be built at the Garden of the Provinces and Territories in Ottawa. On 23 August 2018, Estonia's Victims of Communism 1940–1991 Memorial was inaugurated in Tallinn by President Kersti Kaljulaid. The memorial construction was financed by the state and is managed by the Estonian Institute of Historical Memory. The opening ceremony was chosen to coincide with the official European Day of Remembrance for Victims of Stalinism and Nazism.

According to anthropologist Kristen Ghodsee, efforts to institutionalize the victims of communism narrative, or the moral equivalence between the Nazi Holocaust (race murder) and the victims of communism (class murder), and in particular the recent push at the beginning of the global financial crisis for commemoration of the latter in Europe, can be seen as the response by economic and political elites to fears of a leftist resurgence in the face of devastated economies and extreme inequalities in both the East and West as the result of the excesses of neoliberal capitalism. Ghodsee argues that any discussion of the achievements under communist states, including literacy, education, women's rights, and social security is usually silenced, and any discourse on the subject of communism is focused almost exclusively on Stalin's crimes and the double genocide theory. According to Laure Neumayer, this is used as an anti-communist narrative "based on a series of categories and figures" to "denounce Communist state violence (qualified as 'Communist crimes', 'red genocide' or 'classicide') and to honour persecuted individuals (presented alternatively as 'victims of Communism' and 'heroes of anti totalitarian resistance')."

See also 

 List of socialist states
 List of anarchist communities
 Capitalist state
 List of anti-capitalist and communist parties with national parliamentary representation
 List of communist parties
 Marxism–Leninism–Maoism
 Stalinism

Notes

References

Bibliography

General 
References for when the individuals were elected to the office of CCP leader, the name of the offices and when they established and were abolished are found below.

Articles and journal entries

Books 

 
 
 
 
 
 
 
 
 
 
 
 
 
 
 
 
 
 

 
Authoritarianism
State
Dictatorship
Lists of countries
Maoism
Marxism–Leninism
Socialism
Totalitarianism